Taoyuan City Constituency I includes Luzhu, Guishan, and part of Taoyuan District in Taoyuan City. The district was formerly known as Taoyuan County Constituency I (2008-2014) and was created in 2008, when all local constituencies of the Legislative Yuan were reorganized to become single-member districts.

Current district
 Luzhu
 Guishan
 Taoyuan

Legislators

Election results

 

 
 
 
 
 
 
 

Constituencies in Taoyuan City